The 2009 Asian Karate Championships are the 9th edition of the Asian Karate Championships, and were held in Nanhai Gymnasium, Foshan, China from September 25 to September 27, 2009.

Medalists

Men

Women

Medal table

References
 Results

External links
 akf-karatedo.com

Asian Championships
Asian Karate Championships
Asian Karate Championships
Karate Championships